The Lou Kau Mansion is a historical house in Sé, Macau, China. Built in 1889, the mansion is one of the designated historical sites in the Historic Centre of Macau, a UNESCO World Heritage Site.

History
The building was built around 1889 as a home of Lou Kau, a prominent Chinese merchant. The building has been listed as part of the historic center of Macau and a protected property in 1992. In 2002, the Macau Bureau of Culture started the maintenance for the building and was eventually opened to the public in 2005.

Architecture
The building was built with Portuguese decoration and Chinese architecture style. The blue-bricked building consists of two-story. It has also three courtyards.

Activities
The building regularly hosts small-scale concerts of the Macau Chinese Orchestra.

See also
 List of tourist attractions in Macau

References

1889 establishments in Macau
Buildings and structures in Macau
Houses completed in 1889
Sé, Macau